The Talofofo Pillbox is a historic World War II-era defensive fortification in Talofofo, Guam. Its entrance is on the landward (south) side. This structure was built under the direction of the Imperial Japanese Army during its occupation of Guam in 1941–44.

The pillbox was listed on the National Register of Historic Places in 1991.

See also
National Register of Historic Places listings in Guam

References

Buildings and structures on the National Register of Historic Places in Guam
World War II on the National Register of Historic Places in Guam
1940s establishments in Guam
Talofofo, Guam
Pillboxes (military)